The Cay is a teen novel written by Theodore Taylor. It was published in 1969.

Taylor took only three weeks to write The Cay, having contemplated the story for over a decade after reading about an 11-year-old who was aboard the Dutch ship Hato, when it was torpedoed in 1942, and who was last seen by other stranded survivors as he drifted away on a liferaft. The novel was published in 1969 and dedicated to Martin Luther King Jr.

Plot
When World War II breaks out, 11-year-old Phillip Enright and his mother board the S.S. Hato to Virginia, because his mother feels it is unsafe to stay in Curaçao with the German submarines surrounding the area. The ship is torpedoed, and Phillip is stranded in the sea with an old black man named Timothy and a cat named Stew Cat. Drifting at sea, Phillip is blinded, and Timothy suggests it is because Phillip stared at the sun for too long.

They soon find an island in Devil's Mouth and build a hut while keeping track of the days by putting pebbles in a can. With few supplies, they live alone together for two months, fishing and collecting rain water. The cay is only one mile long and half a mile in width. Initially, the pair are challenged to communicate as they came from different experiences. Eventually they both develop a strong bond of friendship by the end of the novel, as Timothy takes care of Phillip and teaches him to survive independently, to the point where Phillip can survive on his own. 

Airplanes fly over the cay, but they do not see Timothy and Phillip, lengthening their time stranded there. After a hurricane hits the cay, their shelter is destroyed. Timothy attaches himself and Phillip to a palm tree for safety, and Timothy dies from exposure. Phillip, devastated, digs a small grave for him. He is left with only Stew Cat. Phillip is then rescued by a navy vessel.  One year after he and Timothy find the island, he has many surgeries to get his sight back. It turns out he became blind due to being struck in the head by timber causing nerve damage. In the end, Phillip decides he will become a sea explorer and travel to multiple islands and soon hopes to find the Cay he and Timothy had been stranded on, which he is certain he will be able to recognize by closing his eyes.

Characters

Phillip Enright: 11-year-old protagonist and narrator, is marooned on a cay in "The Devil's Mouth" with Timothy. Initially skeptical of Timothy because of his race, he relies on him when he is blinded and comes to appreciate him, creating a strong bond of friendship and trust with Timothy.

Timothy: West Indian native of Charlotte Amalie in Saint Thomas, is marooned with Phillip. He cares for Phillip and understands many survival tactics including fishing and shelter-building. Although at times superstitious, he is old, wise, and patient, stern, and helps Phillip learn to be self-sufficient.

Stew Cat: Phillip and Timothy's companion and fellow castaway. Initially belonging to a cook on the S.S. Hato, Stew Cat is marooned with Phillip and Timothy after the torpedo attack on the ship.

Phillip's Mother, Grace: Accompanies Phillip on the S.S. Hato headed for Virginia, is separated from him when it sinks. Notably racist against the black inhabitants of Curaçao.

Phillip's Father, Phillip Enright Sr.: Relocates the family to the Dutch West Indies for government-related work. He works in an oil refinery that increases the production of aviation gas.

Henrik van Boven: Phillip's Dutch-national friend in Curaçao; he does not understand Phillip's mother's disdain for black people.

Racism

Early in the novel, Phillip's mother, Grace, expresses homesickness for Virginia, and is uncomfortable in Curaçao. She dislikes the (predominantly black) bay workers in Curaçao, and instructs Phillip and his friend Henrik to avoid the area. Henrik doesn't understand why she feels this way, and finds the mindset unusual. Once Phillip is a castaway, he begins to adopt his mother's prejudice tendencies and direct it towards Timothy.

As time goes on, Phillip discovers similarities between himself and Timothy. On page 40, Timothy reveals he's from Charlotte Amalie on St. Thomas; Phillip responds that that means he's American, citing the American purchase of the Virgin Islands from Denmark as a result of the Treaty of the Danish West Indies. Timothy only laughs and mentions that he never gave it much thought. Phillip seems unsure what to make of Timothy and asks if his parents were African; he notices that Timothy looked "pure African" and says he looked very much like men he'd seen in "jungle pictures", but Timothy says he has only ever known the Caribbean islands.

When Phillip ends up blind, he comes to rely upon Timothy to provide for him and teach him. This alters the dynamic of their relationship greatly. Timothy proves to a surprised Phillip that he has a great knowledge of the Caribbean islands and survival tactics, able to make shelter, gather food and water, and survive. He teaches these to Phillip so that he won't be an invalid. In turn, their bond strengthens and Phillip grows to admire and befriend Timothy. He is devastated at Timothy's death, makes a grave for him, and sobs.

When he returns to Curaçao, Phillip spends a lot of time with the workers of St. Anna Bay, many of whom knew Timothy and remember him fondly. Phillip notes that he feels close to those people; he no longer has any prejudice.

Controversy
Published to both wide acclaim and pointed criticism for its impact as a promoter of racial harmony, The Cay received Jane Addams Children's Book Award in 1970. In 1974, when NBC-TV adapted its story for a television drama, the Council on Interracial Books for Children organized a press conference to "urge people to watch the telecast and, if you feel as we do, that an insidiously racist message is contained in the story, please call your local stations."  As part of that press conference, the current chair of the Addams Award Committee, who was not the chair at the time the award was given to The Cay, publicly stated that she thought it was a mistake to have named The Cay an Addams Award winner for having a racist theme.  In response, Taylor, who saw the work as "a subtle plea for better race relations and more understanding," returned the Award "by choice, not in anger, but with troubling questions." In later years, Taylor reported that the Award had been rescinded. Even though The Cay remains on the list of Addams Award winners, Taylor's claim is widely thought to be true and has become a part of reading and discussing the book as required reading in schools in dozens of U.S. states as well as internationally.

Censorship and banning incidents 
In 2020, the Burbank Unified School District banned the book from the curriculum on the back of complaints from four parents who allege the material in the book could lead to potential harm to the district's Black students.

Adaptation and sequel
 The book was adapted into a TV film in 1974 with Alfred Lutter as Phillip, James Earl Jones as Timothy, and Gretchen Corbett as Phillip's mother. Phillip's father was not in the movie.
 In 1993, Taylor published Timothy of the Cay, a book which tells both of Phillip's life after and of Timothy's life before the ordeal.

References

1969 American novels
1969 children's books
American bildungsromans
American children's novels
American novels adapted into films
Castaways in fiction
Curaçao in fiction
Novels about racism
Novels about survival skills
American novels adapted into television shows
Novels set in the Caribbean
Novels set on uninhabited islands
Avon (publisher) books
Novels about blindness